Oleg Sergeyevich Prokofiev (14 December 1928, Paris – 20 August 1998, Alderney) was an artist, sculptor and poet, and the son of composer Sergei Prokofiev.

Artistic life
His career as an artist began at sixteen, attending the Moscow School of Art from 1944 to 1949. On completing his studies, Prokofiev worked in the studio of the painter Robert Falk, leaving in 1952 to work for the Institute of Art History in Moscow. There he studied and published his writing, specializing in the ancient arts of India and South-East Asia. As the second son of Sergei Prokofiev, he wrote that his father's music inspired in him ‘a wave of some wonderful energy…a poetic or artistic impulse’.

During Prokofiev's lifetime he exhibited worldwide, including the UK, (Germany), Russia, France, and the US. As an artist, he was both excited about the future of Art as well as being remarkably informed about its history. During a visit to New York City in 1977, Prokofiev experienced the works of Rothko, Still, Motherwell, Barnett Newman, and Helen Frankenthaler, and these continued to influence his own work throughout the 1980s. He began creating organic constructivist sculptures, and over a short period of time his paintings also began to change. His brightly saturated line paintings and skyline sculptures of the 1980s demonstrate a definite departure from the greys, browns, and masking white works of the 1960s and early 70s.

Oleg's late paintings are also strikingly atmospheric. They astonish both in their freedom of expression and their symbolic intensity whilst maintaining a strong sense of continuity within the artistic tradition of the 20th century.

Since his death, his popular abstract compositions have been exhibited in the collection of the renowned Tretyakov Gallery in Moscow. His work is also in the collections of the Lehmbruck Museum of Modern Sculpture, (Germany); the Zimmerli Art Museum, US; the Leeds City Art Gallery, UK; and the MART Museum, Italy.

Personal life

Born on 14 December 1928, from Sergei Prokofiev's first wife, Lina Llubera (the stage name of Carolina Codina). They lived in Paris until moving to Moscow, in 1935, at the age of seven.

Oleg was first married to Sofia Koravina with whom he had a son, Sergei (1954–2014), who lived from 1985 in Germany and Switzerland with his wife Astrid and who, writing sub nom Sergei O. Prokofieff, wrote profound works in the field of Anthroposophy and, in general, Christian occultism.

In 1960 he met a young English art historian, Camilla Gray, in Moscow. The publication of her ground breaking study of Russian avant-garde ‘Great Experiment: Russian Art, 1863–1922’ infuriated Soviet officials and Camilla and Oleg were not allowed to see each other for six years. Tragically, in 1971, two years after they were eventually allowed to marry, Camilla died. From his second wife Oleg had a daughter, Anastasia.

Oleg decided to move to the West, and from 1971 until his death he lived in Blackheath, London. Oleg married Frances who gave him five children, one of whom, Quentin, died at an early age. Frances Prokofiev, her four children and Anastasia live in Britain. His son Gabriel Prokofiev is a London-based composer, producer and DJ. His son Rupert died in 2017 aged 31 from ataxia–telangiectasia.

Oleg Prokofiev died in 1998 aged 69, while on holiday on the island of Alderney in the English Channel and is buried on the west side of Highgate Cemetery.

Selected exhibitions
 2014 – 'From East to West' at Hill Gallery, London
 1999 – DeliArt, London
 1997 – Museum of Music, Moscow
 1994 – Contemporary, London
 1993 – W. Lehmbruck Museum of Modern Sculpture, Germany
 1991 – Lemington Spa Art Gallery and Museum; Malvern Winter Gardens
 1989 – Sue Rankin Gallery, London; La Mama Galleria, New York City
 1988 – Burg Zweiffel, (Germany); ‘100 Years of British Art’ at Leeds City Art Gallery
 1987 – Dortmund Opera House and Matthew Scott Gallery, Miami
 1985 – Woodlands Art Gallery, London
 1984–1985 – Galerie ‘Edition de Beauclair’, Munich; and Theater am Gartnerplatz, Munich
 1984 – Old Vic Theatre, London; Galerie Johanna Ricard, Nuremberg
 1983 – ACG, London
 1981 – Galerie Mandragore, Paris
 1980 – Galerie C. Ratie, Paris
 1977 – Norther Artists Gallery, Harrogate
 1976 – University of Surrey, Guildford; Sadlers Wells Theatre, London
 1975 – Coard, Paris
 1974 – Leeds City Art Gallery

References

External links
 Biography about Oleg Prokofiev's life and work (lang. English)
 Web page by Hay Hill Gallery (lang. English)
 Short Video about Oleg Prokofiev by Hay Hill Gallery
 Russian poems by Oleg Prokofiev and an essay about him (lang: Russian)

Russian male poets
20th-century Russian sculptors
20th-century Russian male artists
Russian male sculptors
20th-century Russian painters
Russian male painters
1928 births
1998 deaths
Burials at Highgate Cemetery
20th-century Russian poets
20th-century Russian male writers
Soviet sculptors
Soviet painters
Soviet male poets
Soviet people of Spanish descent